Effector is an electronica album by Canadian electronic music group Download.

Track listing 

 "Carrier Tone" – 4:02
 "Muscaria" – 5:09
 "Vagator" – 6:12
 "Ego Dissolve" – 5:31
 "The Guide" – 5:27
 "Chrysanthemum" – 5:03
 "Ayahuasca" – 3:55
 "Two Worlds Collide" – 6:44
 "Affirmed" – 4:04

All songs by cEvin Key & Phil Western, except for "Ego Dissolve" and "Ayahuasca" by Key, Western & Van Rooy.

Personnel
cEvin Key
Phil Western

Guests
William van Rooy - additional electronics (4, 7)

Notes
The cover is a photograph of an amusement ride in Dresden, taken by Anthony Valcic using a very slow shutter speed.

"Muscaria" begins with a backwards-masked sample from Quebec blues-rock band Offenbach's "Promenade sur Mars".

Reference List 

2000 albums
Download (band) albums